The Last Disaster is a juvenile science fiction novel, the eighteenth in Hugh Walters' Chris Godfrey of U.N.E.X.A. series. It was published in the UK by Faber in 1978

Plot summary
The Moon's orbit suddenly starts to decay for reasons unknown; discovered when a solar eclipse arrives a few minutes early.  The only hope of averting imminent disaster is an  experimental anti-gravity device devised by an eccentric, elderly Welsh professor, who disillusioned with mankind, refuses to help...

Reception
Norman Culpan in the School Librarian stated ' Simplifications... are acceptable for ten- to twelve-year-olds, since the overall 
picture is valid given the premises from which the story begins' while Brian Stableford was more critical saying 'Anyone but a moron will notice immediately that this is a non-starter.' and 'Hugh Walters ..... obviously knows no better, but it is hard to explain why the editor who accepted this book is .... a manifest cretin. Perhaps they just don't care.'

References

External links
The Last Disaster page

1978 British novels
1978 science fiction novels
Chris Godfrey of U.N.E.X.A. series
Faber and Faber books
Novels about impact events
Novels set on the Moon